Playboy is the third album by the Motown girl group The Marvelettes, released in 1962. It capitalized on their hit singles "Playboy" and "Beechwood 4-5789". It also includes the single "Someday, Someway" and "Forever", a heartfelt standard that would be released the following year as the B-side of the single "Locking Up My Heart" and join the A-side on the charts. Other compositions include "Goddess of Love", "Cry Over You", and "Mix It Up". George Gordy, William "Mickey" Stevenson and Marvin Gaye, who had produced "Beechwood 4-5789" all did some work on the Playboy LP as well.

The album would be the last to feature the backing vocals of original Marvelette, Juanita Cowart on every track, as she would opt out of the group in early 1963.

Track listing
Superscript denotes lead singer: (a) Gladys Horton, (b) Wanda Young
Side 1
"Playboy" (Gladys Horton, Brian Holland, William Stevenson, Robert Bateman) a
"Mix It Up" (William Stevenson) a
"Beechwood 4-5789" (Marvin Gaye, George Gordy) a
"I'm Hooked" (Berry Gordy, Jr.) a
"I Think I Can Change You" (William Robinson) a

Side 2
"Forever" (Brian Holland, Lamont Dozier, Freddie Gorman) b
"Someday, Someway" (Brian Holland, Lamont Dozier, Freddie Gorman) a
"Goddess of Love" (Lamont Dozier) b
"You Should Know" (Brian Holland, Janie Bradford, Stanley Ossman) a
"(I've Got To) Cry Over You" (Berry Gordy, Jr.) a

Personnel
The Mervelettes 
Gladys Horton – lead and background vocals
Wanda Young – lead and background vocals
Georgeanna Tillman – background vocals
Katherine Anderson – background vocals
Wyanetta "Juanita" Cowart – background vocals
with:
Marvin Gaye – producer, drums on "Beechwood 4-5789"
William "Mickey" Stevenson – producer
George Gordy – producer
Raynoma Liles Gordy – Hammond organ on "Forever" and "Someday, Someday"
The Funk Brothers – other instrumentation
Joe Hunter – piano on "Playboy", "Forever" and "Someday, Someday"
Richard "Popcorn" Wylie – piano on "Beechwood 4-5789" 
James Jamerson – bass on "Playboy" and "Beechwood 4-5789" 
Clarence Isabell – bass on "Forever" and "Someday, Someday" 
Benny Benjamin – drums on "Playboy", "Forever" and "Someday, Someday" 
Eddie Willis – guitar on "Playboy", "Beechwood 4-5789", "Forever" and "Someday, Someday"
Hank Cosby – tenor saxophone on "Playboy", "Beechwood 4-579", "Forever" and "Someday, Someday"
Andrew "Mike" Terry – baritone saxophone on "Playboy", "Beechwood 4-5789", "Forever" and "Someday, Someday"
Eddie "Bongo" Brown – percussion on "Beechwood 4-5789"

References

External links 
Don't Forget the Motor City
Don't Forget the Motor City

1962 albums
The Marvelettes albums
Albums produced by Marvin Gaye
Albums produced by William "Mickey" Stevenson
Albums produced by Lamont Dozier
Albums produced by Brian Holland
Tamla Records albums
Albums recorded at Hitsville U.S.A.